By-elections for 6 constituencies of the West Bengal Legislative Assembly were held after the 2021 West Bengal Legislative Assembly election

Results

Background
Sovandeb Chattopadhyay resigned from his seat in the Bhabanipur (Vidhan Sabha constituency) for CM Mamata Bannerjee to contest the Legislative Assembly by-elections.

On 30 September 2021, the Election Commission of India (ECI) announced a by-election for the Bhabanipur seat. Later, the ECI announced remaining vacant seats for elections on 30 October 2021.

Summary

Constituency-wise results

Reason for vacancy of their seats:

See also
 2021 West Bengal Legislative Assembly election
 2016–2021 West Bengal Legislative Assembly by-elections
 2016–2021 Tamil Nadu Legislative Assembly by-elections
 2021 elections in India

References

By-elections in India
West Bengal Legislative Assembly